Coca is a Thai hot pot restaurant chain, established in 1957. It began as a 20-seat restaurant in Soi Dejo, Thailand. The successful business expanded to an 800-seat restaurant in nine years.

History
In 1987, Coca launched its first remote venture in Singapore. The success and popularity of the first two restaurants Chinatown Plaza and International Building (Orchard Road) was one of the leading factors that sparked the trust, and confidence of many businessmen to invest in the Coca Restaurant Group. Today the group extended their services throughout Asia in Thailand, Singapore, Japan, ROC, Myanmar, Indonesia, Malaysia, Korea, Lao P.D.R., Cambodia, and Vietnam.

Coca Steamboat is famous for its homemade "Coca Sauce".

References

External links
Coca Steamboat Thailand
Coca Steamboat Singapore
Frommers reviewpublished in the New York Times Travel Guide

Restaurant chains in Singapore
Food and drink companies of Thailand
Restaurants established in 1957
1957 establishments in Thailand